Walter IV may refer to:

 Walter IV, Count of Brienne (1205–1244)
 Walter IV, Count of Enghien (died in 1381)